The 2014 United States House of Representatives elections in Iowa were held on Tuesday, November 4, 2014, to elect the four U.S. representatives from the state of Iowa, one from each of the state's four congressional districts. The elections coincided with the elections of other federal and state offices, including Governor of Iowa and United States Senate. Primary elections were held on June 4, 2014. As no candidate won more than 35% of the vote in the 3rd district Republican primary, that nomination was decided at a party convention on June 21.

Overview

By district
Results of the 2014 United States House of Representatives elections in Iowa by district:

District 1

Democratic Representative Bruce Braley won re-election in 2012. He will not run for re-election in 2014, as he will instead run for the United States Senate seat being vacated by fellow Democrat Tom Harkin, who is retiring.

Democratic primary

Candidates
Declared
 Swati Dandekar, member of the Iowa Utilities Board and former state senator
 Anesa Kajtazovic, state representative
 Pat Murphy, state representative and former Speaker of the Iowa House of Representatives
 Dave O'Brien, attorney and candidate for Iowa's 6th congressional district in 1988
 Monica Vernon, Cedar Rapids City Councilwoman

Declined
 Bruce Braley, incumbent U.S. Representative (running for the U.S. Senate)
 Jeff Danielson, state senator
 Pam Jochum, state senator
 Liz Mathis, state senator
 Tyler Olson, state representative and former chairman of the Iowa Democratic Party
 Steve Sodders, state senator

Endorsements

Polling

Results

Republican primary

Candidates
Declared
 Rod Blum, businessman and candidate in 2012
 Gail Boliver, attorney
 Steve Rathje, businessman

Withdrew
 Walt Rogers, state representative

Declined
 Ben Lange, attorney and nominee in 2010 and 2012
 Paul Pate, former mayor of Cedar Rapids, former Iowa Secretary of State and former state senator (running for secretary of state)
 Kraig Paulsen, Speaker of the Iowa House of Representatives
 Renee Schulte, former state representative

Endorsements

Polling

Results

General election

Polling

Results

District 2

Democratic Representative David Loebsack has represented Iowa's 2nd district since 2007.  He was elected to a fourth term in 2012 against Republican John Archer with 56% of the vote.

Democratic primary

Candidates
Declared
 David Loebsack, incumbent U.S. Representative

Results

Republican primary

Candidates
Declared
 Mark Lofgren, state representative
 Mariannette Miller-Meeks, ophthalmologist, former director of the Iowa Department of Public Health and nominee for the seat in 2008 and 2010
 Matthew C. Waldren

Polling

Results

General election

Polling

Results

District 3

Prior to the 2012 elections, Republican Representative Tom Latham and Democratic Representative Leonard Boswell were redistricted into the same district. Though Barack Obama carried the district in the 2012 presidential election, Latham defeated Boswell. Latham is retiring in 2014.

Republican primary

Candidates
Declared
 Robert Cramer, bridge construction contractor and chairman of the board of The Family Leader
 Joe Grandanette, teacher and business owner
 Matt Schultz, Iowa Secretary of State
 Monte Shaw, executive director of the Iowa Renewable Fuels Association
 David Young, former chief of staff to Senator Chuck Grassley and former candidate for the U.S. Senate
 Brad Zaun, state senator and nominee in 2010

Declined
 Jeff Ballenger, businessman and candidate for IA-05 in 2002
 Jake Chapman, state senator
 Peter Cownie, state representative
 Joni Ernst, state senator (running for the U.S. Senate)
 Brenna Findley, legal counsel for Governor Branstad and nominee for attorney general in 2010
 David Fischer, vice-chair of the Republican Party of Iowa
 Steve Gaer, Mayor of West Des Moines
 Chris Hagenow, state representative
 Mary Ann Hanusa, state representative
 Mark Jacobs, former CEO of Reliant Energy (running for the U.S. Senate)
 Jeff Lamberti, former president of the Iowa Senate and nominee in 2006
 Tom Latham, incumbent U.S. Representative
 Isaiah McGee, Waukee City Councilman
 David Oman, businessman and candidate for governor in 1998
 Kim Reynolds, Lieutenant Governor of Iowa
 Charles Schneider, state senator
 Brent Siegrist, former Speaker of the Iowa House of Representatives
 Matt Strawn, former chairman of the Republican Party of Iowa
 Rob Taylor, state representative
 Bob Vander Plaats, social conservative activist, candidate for governor in 2002, 2006 and 2010 and nominee for lieutenant governor in 2006
 Matthew Whitaker, former U.S. Attorney for the Southern District of Iowa and nominee for Treasurer of Iowa in 2002 (running for the U.S. Senate)
 Jack Whitver, state senator

Endorsements

Polling

Results

Convention
The Republican nomination was decided by a convention after none of the six candidates reached the 35 percent threshold required to make the general election ballot. This was the second time in 50 years that a convention picked a nominee and the first time since 2002, when then-State Senator Steve King won a convention held in Iowa's 5th congressional district to decide the Republican nominee for Congress. A poll conducted by the conservative website Caffeinated Thoughts of 118 of the 513 delegates was held on June 9–10. David Young and Brad Zaun took 27% each, with Robert Cramer on 19%, Monte Shaw on 14%, Matt Schultz on 8% and Joe Grandanette on 3% with another 3% undecided. 34% chose Young as their second choice, with 17% choosing Cramer, Schultz or Zaun, 10% picking Shaw and 3% picking Grandanette with 8% undecided.

On June 21, in what was described as a "stunning upset", David Young won the nomination on the fifth ballot of the convention.

On July 4, Zaun voiced his disappointment and suggested he would leave the Republican Party, leading some to encourage him to run for the seat as an Independent. He had previously announced that he would introduce legislation to hold primary runoff elections instead of conventions. On July 10, Zaun announced that despite his frustrations, he would not leave the Republican Party or run as an Independent.

Democratic primary

Candidates
Declared
 Staci Appel, former state senator

Withdrew
 Gabriel De La Cerda, former tire factory worker
 Michael Sherzan, businessman

Declined
 Leonard Boswell, former U.S. Representative
 Scott Brennan, chairman of the Iowa Democratic Party
 Frank Cownie, Mayor of Des Moines
 Chet Culver, former governor
 Ed Fallon, former state representative, candidate for governor in 2006 and candidate for the seat in 2008
 Michael Gronstal, Majority Leader of the Iowa Senate
 Jack Hatch, state senator (running for Governor)
 Tom Henderson, attorney and chairman of the Polk County Democratic Party
 Tom Hockensmith, Polk County Supervisor
 Michael Kiernan, former Des Moines city councilman and former chairman of the Iowa Democratic Party
 Bob Krause, former state representative, nominee for state treasurer in 1978, candidate for Mayor of Waterloo in 1982 and candidate for the U.S. Senate in 2010
 Matt McCoy, state senator
 Andy McGuire, health insurance executive and candidate for Lieutenant Governor of Iowa in 2006
 Janet Petersen, state representative
 Dusky Terry, Mayor of Earlham and candidate for Iowa Attorney General in 2006
 Christie Vilsack, former First Lady of Iowa and nominee for Iowa's 4th congressional district in 2012
 Tom Vilsack, United States Secretary of Agriculture and former governor of Iowa

Endorsements

Results

General election

Polling

Results

District 4

Republican Representative Steve King won re-election in the 4th district in 2012, after serving in the now defunct .

Republican primary

Candidates
Declared
 Steve King, incumbent U.S. Representative

Results

Democratic primary

Candidates
Declared
 Jim Mowrer, veteran and a former special assistant to the United States Under Secretary of the Army

Declined
 Christie Vilsack, former First Lady of Iowa and nominee in 2012

Results

General election

Polling

Results

See also
 2014 United States House of Representatives elections
 2014 United States elections

References

External links
U.S. House elections in Iowa, 2014 at Ballotpedia
Campaign contributions at OpenSecrets

Iowa
2014
United States House of Representatives